The Columbiana County Infirmary is located near Lisbon, Ohio. The four building complex provided care for the poor and mentally ill of the county. By 1861 a large T-shaped building was constructed.

The Infirmary is now closed. It was added to the National Register of Historic Places in June 1979.

References

County government buildings in Ohio
Government buildings on the National Register of Historic Places in Ohio
Infrastructure completed in 1845
Buildings and structures in Columbiana County, Ohio
National Register of Historic Places in Columbiana County, Ohio
1829 establishments in Ohio